The Soul of Ben Webster is an album by American jazz saxophonist Ben Webster featuring tracks recorded in 1958 for the Verve label.

Reception

Allmusic awarded the album 4 stars with its review by Scott Yanow stating "The great tenor is at his best on a beautiful version of "Chelsea Bridge" and "When I Fall in Love"... Recommended".

Track listing
All compositions by Ben Webster except as indicated
 "Fajista" - 3:48     
 "Chelsea Bridge" (Billy Strayhorn) - 3:40     
 "Charlotte's Piccolo" - 15:31     
 "Coal Train" - 4:10     
 "When I Fall in Love" (Edward Heyman, Victor Young) - 4:59     
 "Ev's Mad" - 4:23     
 "Ash" - 8:24

Personnel 
Ben Webster, Harold Ashby - tenor saxophone
Art Farmer - trumpet
Mundell Lowe - guitar  
Jimmy Jones - piano
Milt Hinton - bass
Dave Bailey - drums

References 

1959 albums
Ben Webster albums
Albums produced by Norman Granz
Verve Records albums